The 2008–09 Umaglesi Liga was the twentieth season of top-tier football in Georgia. It was scheduled to begin in August 2008, but the start of the league was delayed due to the 2008 South Ossetia war. The first round of games finally took place on 13 and 14 September 2008. The season ended with the 33rd round played on 23 May 2009. Dinamo Tbilisi were the defending champions.

The league was reduced from 14 to 12 teams prior to this season. However, Ameri Tbilisi voluntarily withdrew from the competition in mid-July because of financial reasons. As no replacement team was announced, the league featured only 11 teams.

Promotion and relegation
Merani Tbilisi, Dinamo Batumi and Dila Gori were relegated at the end of the previous season due to finishing 12th through 14th, respectively. Spartaki Tskhinvali, who finished the previous season in 11th place, retained their spot in Umaglesi Liga after defeating Pirveli Liga runners-up Gagra by 1–0.

Due to the reduction of league size, only Pirveli Liga champions Chiatura were promoted. However, they did not want to compete in 2008–09 Umaglesi Liga because of unknown reasons, so Gagra took their spot.

Stadia and locations

League table

Results

First and second round

Third round

See also
2008–09 Pirveli Liga
2008–09 Georgian Cup

References

External links
 Georgian Football Federation 
 Georgian Professional Football League 
 Season on soccerway

Erovnuli Liga seasons
1
Georgia